The Last Airbender Prequel: Zuko's Story is a graphic novel written by Dave Roman and Alison Wilgus and illustrated by Nina Matsumoto. It is a prequel to the 2010 The Last Airbender film, directed by M. Night Shyamalan, and was released on May 18, 2010. It is set before the events of The Last Airbender and centers around the character of Zuko immediately following his banishment. The characters were drawn to look as they do in the film, but characters who weren't in the film—such as Mai and Ty Lee—were drawn according to their original designs from the Avatar: The Last Airbender animated series.

Plot
An hour after the Agni Kai with Ozai, Prince Zuko wakes up in an infirmary. The comic starts with him running to his room, chased by Iroh. He dreams about the Agni Kai, crying violently, when he hears a knock on the door, he thinks is Ozai, but it is actually his 11-year-old sister, Azula, who has come to taunt him about his banishment. Through later events, she gets Zuko a ship, a crew and Iroh to come along. He scours the Western Air Temple, and visits Fire Sage Shyu, looking for information on the Avatar. In the Colonies, a man in a Red mask (the Red Spirit) steals from him, later teaching him to rely on swords rather than firebending to become the Blue Spirit. Then, Zuko goes to the Eastern Air Temple, and mistakes Pathik for the Avatar, due to his age. After a fight, Zuko demands Pathik to airbend, but winds up finding him not to be the Avatar. That night, Avatar Yangchen gives Pathik a vision of Zuko and the Avatar together, facing the world. Three years have passed since Zuko's  journey began, with his intentions becoming less sinister. However, as he sees a light come from a distant iceberg in the Southern Water Tribe, the need to restore his honor returns to him. He smiles and says, "Finally".

References

 
 

2010 graphic novels
Zuko's Story
Prequel comics
Del Rey Manga